Brydalen Church is a parish church of the Church of Norway in Tynset Municipality in Innlandet county, Norway. It is located in the village of Brydalen. It is the church for the Brydalen parish which is part of the Nord-Østerdal prosti (deanery) in the Diocese of Hamar. The white, wooden church was built in a long church design in 1884 using plans drawn up by the architect Ole Buhagen. The church seats about 100 people.

History
The Brydalen valley was not settled until the 1700s. In 1871, a cemetery was established in the village. In 1883, a small chapel was built by the cemetery. Ole Buhaugen was the architect and possibly the builder as well. The new chapel built with donations and volunteer labour. It was completed and consecrated in 1884. It was also used as a school for many years. Originally, the building was an annex chapel, but in 1926 it was upgraded and enlarged to become a parish church.

See also
List of churches in Hamar

References

Tynset
Churches in Innlandet
Long churches in Norway
Wooden churches in Norway
19th-century Church of Norway church buildings
Churches completed in 1884
1884 establishments in Norway